Thomas Golden (1881–1952) was a pioneer Australian rugby league footballer who played in the 1900s.

Playing career
Golden came from South Sydney's rugby union ranks to convert to the new game of rugby league in 1908. He played in the first South Sydney premiership team in 1908 and played the following season before retiring. He also represented a combined firsts Sydney team that played a match in 1909.

Death
A Surry Hills, New South Wales local for his entire life, Golden died at St. Vincent's Hospital on 3 September 1952, aged 70.

References

South Sydney Rabbitohs players
Australian rugby league players
1881 births
1952 deaths
Rugby league players from Sydney
Rugby league locks
Rugby league second-rows